In mathematics, a Zimmert set is a set of positive integers associated with the structure of quotients of hyperbolic three-space by a Bianchi group.

Definition
Fix an integer d and let D be the discriminant of the imaginary quadratic field Q(√-d).  The Zimmert set Z(d) is the set of positive integers n such that 4n2 < -D-3 and n ≠ 2; D is a quadratic non-residue of all odd primes in d; n is odd if D is not congruent to 5 modulo 8.  The cardinality of Z(d) may be denoted by z(d).

Property
For all but a finite number of d we have z(d) > 1: indeed this is true for all d > 10476.

Application
Let Γd denote the Bianchi group PSL(2,Od), where Od is the ring of integers of.  As a subgroup of PSL(2,C), there is an action of Γd on hyperbolic 3-space H3, with a fundamental domain.  It is a theorem that there are only finitely many values of d for which Γd can contain an arithmetic subgroup G for which the quotient H3/G is a link complement.  Zimmert sets are used to obtain results in this direction: z(d) is a lower bound for the rank of the largest free quotient of Γd and so the result above implies that almost all Bianchi groups have non-cyclic free quotients.

References

 

Integer sequences
Hyperbolic geometry